Sharpsburg Historic District is a national historic district located at Sharpsburg, Washington County, Maryland.

It was listed on the National Register of Historic Places in 2008.

References

External links
 at Maryland Historical Trust
Boundary Map of the Sharpsburg Historic District, Washington County, at Maryland Historical Trust

Historic districts on the National Register of Historic Places in Maryland
Historic districts in Washington County, Maryland
Sharpsburg, Maryland
National Register of Historic Places in Washington County, Maryland